Neodyschirius cruciatus is a species of beetle in the family Carabidae, the only species in the genus Neodyschirius.

References

Scaritinae